Low-density lipoprotein receptor adapter protein 1 is a protein that in humans is encoded by the LDLRAP1 gene.

The protein encoded by this gene is a cytosolic protein which contains a phosphotyrosine binding (PTB) domain. The PTB domain has been found to interact with the cytoplasmic tail of the LDL receptor. Mutations in this gene lead to LDL receptor malfunction and cause the disorder autosomal recessive hypercholesterolaemia.

Interactions
LDLRAP1 has been shown to interact with AP2B1 and LRP2.

References

Further reading